María Procopio (born 1 March 1951) is an Argentine former swimmer. She competed in two events at the 1968 Summer Olympics.

References

1951 births
Living people
Argentine female swimmers
Olympic swimmers of Argentina
Swimmers at the 1968 Summer Olympics
Sportspeople from Avellaneda